White Cross is a hamlet in mid Cornwall, England, United Kingdom. It lies on the border between the three parishes of Colan, St Enoder, and St Columb Major. It is on the A392 between Indian Queens and Newquay.

POW Camp 115, Whitecross, St. Columb Major was situated near the village.

References

Hamlets in Cornwall
St Columb Major